Stampede Wrestling was a professional wrestling promotion based in Calgary, Alberta from 1948 to 1990 and from 1999 to 2008. Former employees in Stampede consisted of professional wrestlers, managers, play-by-play and colour commentators, announcers, interviewers and referees.

Alumni

Male wrestlers

Female wrestlers

Midget wrestlers

Stables and tag teams

Managers and valets

Commentators and interviewers

Referees

Context table

References
Specific

General

Further reading

External links
Stampede Wrestling at Cagematch.net

Stampede Wrestling at OWW.com

Stampede Wrestling alumni